Brett Williams may refer to:
Brett Williams (offensive lineman) (born 1980), American football player
Brett Williams (defensive lineman) (born 1958), Canadian football player
Brett Williams (defensive end), former defensive end for the Los Angeles Xtreme
Brett Williams (footballer, born 1968), English footballer
Brett Williams (footballer, born 1987), English footballer
Brett T. Williams, U.S. Air Force officer and cybersecurity expert
Brett Williams (Australian cricketer) (born 1967), Australian cricketer
Brett Williams (New Zealand cricketer) (born 1965), New Zealand cricketer